Rhodionin is a herbacetin rhamnoside found in Rhodiola species.

References 

Flavonol rhamnosides